Iowa Oaks may refer to:

 Iowa Oaks (baseball), a Minor League Baseball team in Des Moines, Iowa, during 1969–1981; later known as the Iowa Cubs
 Iowa Oaks (Prairie Meadows), a Grade III thoroughbred horse race at Prairie Meadows in Altoona, Iowa